Biliverdin reductase (BVR) is an enzyme found in all tissues under normal conditions, but especially in reticulo-macrophages of the liver and spleen.  BVR facilitates the conversion of biliverdin to bilirubin via the reduction of a double-bond between the second and third pyrrole ring into a single-bond.

There are two isozymes, in humans,  each encoded by its own gene, biliverdin reductase A (BLVRA) and biliverdin reductase B (BLVRB).

Mechanism of catalysis 
BVR acts on biliverdin by reducing its double-bond between the pyrrole rings into a single-bond. It accomplishes this using NADPH + H+ as an electron donor, forming bilirubin and NADP+ as products.

BVR catalyzes this reaction through an overlapping binding site including Lys18, Lys22, Lys179, Arg183, and Arg185 as key residues. This binding site attaches to biliverdin, and causes its dissociation from heme oxygenase (HO) (which catalyzes reaction of ferric heme --> biliverdin), causing the subsequent reduction to bilirubin.

Structure 

BVR is composed of two closely packed domains, between 247-415 amino acids long and containing a Rossmann fold.  BVR has also been determined to be a zinc-binding protein with each enzyme protein having one strong-binding zinc atom.

The C-terminal half of BVR contains the catalytic domain, which adopts a structure containing a six-stranded beta-sheet that is flanked on one face by several alpha-helices. This domain contains the catalytic active site, which reduces the gamma-methene bridge of the open tetrapyrrole, biliverdin IX alpha, to bilirubin with the concomitant oxidation of a NADH or NADPH cofactor.

Function 

BVR works with the biliverdin/bilirubin redox cycle.  It converts biliverdin to bilirubin (a strong antioxidant), which is then converted back into biliverdin through the actions of reactive oxygen species (ROS).  This cycle allows for the neutralization of ROS, and the reuse of biliverdin products.  Biliverdin also is replenished in the cycle with its formation from heme units through heme oxygenase (HO) localized from the endoplasmic reticulum.

Bilirubin, being one of the last products of heme degradation in the liver, is further processed and excreted in bile after conjugation with glucuronic acid.  In this way, BVR is essential in many mammals for the disposal of heme catabolites – especially in the fetus  where the placental membranes are bilirubin-permeable but not biliverdin-permeable - aiding in the removal of potentially toxic protein build-up.

BVR has also more recently been recognized as a regulator of glucose metabolism and in cell growth and apoptosis control, due to its dual-specificity kinase character.  This control over glucose metabolism indicates that BVR may play a role in pathogenesis of multiple metabolic diseases - the notable one being diabetes, by control of the upstream activator of insulin growth factor-1 (IGF-1) and mitogen-activated protein kinase (MAPK) signaling pathway.

Disease relevance 

BVR acts as a means to regenerate bilirubin in a repeating redox cycle without significantly modifying the concentration of available bilirubin.  With these levels maintained, it appears that BVR represents a new strategy for the treatment of multiple sclerosis and other types of oxidative stress-mediated diseases.  The mechanism is due to the amplification of the potent antioxidant actions of bilirubin, as this can ameliorate free radical-mediated diseases.

Studies have shown that the BVR redox cycle is essential in providing physiological cytoprotection.  Genetic knock-outs and reduced BVR levels have demonstrated increased formation of ROS, and results in augmented cell death.  Cells that experienced a 90% reduction in BVR experienced three times normal ROS levels.  Through this protective and amplifying cycle, BVR allows low concentrations of bilirubin to overcome 10,000-fold higher concentrations of ROS.

References

External links 
 

Protein domains
EC 1.3.1